Our Lady of the Angel is a monastery that is located near Orebić, a town on the Pelješac peninsula, in the Dubrovnik-Neretva County, Croatia.

The monastery was built at the end of the 16th century under the Republic of Ragusa (Dubrovnik), to which the town of Orebić belonged to between 1333 and 1806. It was built by the Franciscans and is of a Gothic-Renaissance style.

The monastery is surrounded by dense pine wood forests and is located on a craggy stone crest 152 metres above the sea. It has a bird's-eye view east, south and west over the Korčula and Pelješac sea channel with the old town of Korčula in the background. The building consists of one large floor with four outer wings. The whole building forms a unit with the church and is dominated by the bell tower. Petar Tolstoj, a Russian lord and travel writer, mentioned the monastery in 1868. German prince Philipp of Coburg stayed at the monastery in 1905 and the British writer Seaton Watson was there in 1913.

Seamen passing under the monastery would traditionally greet it with three calls on their ship sirens, and then the Franciscans would answer with their church bells which then produced a brilliant sound. The sound of the church bells could be heard throughout the sea channel.

See also
Croatia
Pelješac
Dalmatia
Republic of Ragusa

References

External links
Translation of the official website at the Franciscan Province of St. Jerome

Franciscan monasteries in Croatia
Christian monasteries established in the 16th century
Buildings and structures in Dubrovnik-Neretva County
16th-century Roman Catholic church buildings in Croatia
Franciscan churches in Croatia